Ousman Maheshe (born April 2, 2002) is a Congolese professional football player.

Early life
Born in the Democratic Republic of Congo, Mahesle grew up in Edmonton, Alberta. He began playing youth soccer at age four with the South Clareview Cobras, later playing with Xtreme FC, Victoria FC, and St. Albert Impact, also playing for the Alberta provincial team, where after impressing at nationals, he was selected to join a Canada U15 camp. At the age of 14, he joined the FC Edmonton Academy.

College career
In 2019, he committed to attend the Northern Alberta Institute of Technology, where he would play for the men's soccer team beginning in 2020. In his first season playing for the Ooks in 2021, he scored 10 goals in six league games, to lead the Alberta Colleges Athletics Conference. He scored another eight goals in four national championship matches, helping the Ooks to a third-place finish, including a four-goal performance against the Brandon Bobcats and a hat trick the next day against St. Thomas Tommies. That year, he was named to the 2021-22 ACAC Men's Soccer All-Conference Team and a 2021 CCAA Men's Soccer Championship All-Star.

In 2022, he began attending MacEwan University, playing for the men's soccer team.

Club career
In 2021, he played with Edmonton Scottish in the 2021 Summer Series.

On March 29, 2022, he signed a contract with HFX Wanderers FC of the Canadian Premier League, immediately being sent on loan to FC Edmonton. He made his professional debut, in a substitute appearance, on May 15 against Pacific FC. In August, he departed the club, returning to university, as part of his developmental contract.

International career
In November 2016, he attended a training camp with the Canada U15 team.

References

External links

NAIT Ooks profile

2002 births
Living people
Association football forwards
Democratic Republic of the Congo footballers
Canadian soccer players
Democratic Republic of the Congo emigrants to Canada
Canadian Premier League players
FC Edmonton players